Sulong Zambales Party is the ruling political party in Zambales, Philippines, founded by incumbent Zambales Governor Hermogenes Ebdane in 2012.

Liberal Party Endorsement
On April 5, 2016, President Benigno Aquino III and Liberal Party standard bearer Mar Roxas officially endorsed Zambales Governor Hermogenes Ebdane and the whole Sulong Zambales Party slate except for 2nd district representative which they support Cheryl Deloso.

Officers
 Jun Omar Ebdane - Incumbent Sulong Zambales Party President, former Zambales Representative, 2nd District (2011-2013)
 Hermogenes Ebdane - Incumbent Sulong Zambales Party Chairman, Elected Governor of Zambales (2010 – present)
 Jeffrey Khonghun (Nationalist People's Coalition) - Vice Chairman (1st District, Zambales), Incumbent Representative (1st District, Zambales)
 Jessu Edora - Vice Chairman (2nd District, Zambales), former mayor of Masinloc, Zambales
 Ramon Lacbain II - Secretary-General, Incumbent Vice-Governor (Province of Zambales) (2001 – 2007; 2010 – present)

Other notable members
 Jun Rundstedt Ebdane - Iba, Zambales Municipal Mayor (2013–present)
 Bing Ecdao Maniquiz - Botolan, Zambales Municipal Mayor (2013–present)
 Aireen Maniquiz Binan - Iba, Zambales Municipal Vice Mayor (2016–present)
 Jay Khonghun (Nationalist People's Coalition) - Municipal Mayor (Subic)
 Connie Marty - Municipal Mayor (Sta. Cruz)
 Luisito Marty - Former Sta. Cruz, Zambales Mayor, wife of incumbent Mayor Connie Marty, official candidate of Sulong Zambales for Mayor
 Jose Rodriguez - Municipal Mayor (San Marcelino)
 Ronaldo Apostol - Municipal Mayor (Cabangan)
 Napoleon Edquid - Municipal Mayor (Candelaria)
 Desiree Edora - Municipal Mayor (Masinloc)
 Generoso Amog - Municipal Mayor (Palauig)
 Carolyn Fariñas - Municipal Mayor (San Felipe)
 Peter Lim - Municipal Mayor (San Narciso)
 Renato Collado
 Samuel Ablola
 Sancho Abasta Jr.
 Porfirio Elamparo
 Jesse Mendigorin
 Jean Morana
 Roberto Blanco

2016 Election Candidates

 Hermogenes Ebdane Jr. – Governor, Zambales
 Ramon Lacbain II – Vice-Governor, Zambales

1st District (Zambales)
 Jeffrey Khonghun – Representative, 1st District of Zambales
 John John Felarca – Board Member 1st District of Zambales
 Jose Guttierez Jr. – Board Member 1st District of Zambales
 Jon Khonghun – Board Member 1st District of Zambales
 Jay Khonghun – Mayor, Subic, Zambales
 Jose Angelo Dominguez – Mayor, Castillejos
 Jose Rodriguez Jr. – Mayor, San Marcelino, Zambales

2nd District (Zambales)
 Reinhard Jeresano – Representative, 2nd District of Zambales
 Sancho Abasta Jr. – Board Member, 2nd District of Zambales
 Sam Ablola – Board Member, 2nd District of Zambales
 Renato Collado – Board Member, 2nd District of Zambales
 Jury Deloso – Board Member, 2nd District of Zambales
 Rolex Estella – Board Member, 2nd District of Zambales
 Noel Ferrer – Board Member, 2nd District of Zambales
 Romelino Gojo – Board Member, 2nd District of Zambales
 Estela Deloso-Antipolo – Mayor, San Antonio, Zambales
 Peter Lim – Mayor, San Narciso, Zambales
 Carolyn Fariñas – Mayor, San Felipe
 Joy Apostol – Mayor, Cabangan, Zambales
 Bing Maniquiz – Mayor, Botolan, Zambales
 Rundstedt Ebdane – Mayor, Iba, Zambales
 Chito Marty - Mayor, Santa Cruz, Zambales

References

Local political parties in the Philippines
Political parties established in 2012
2012 establishments in the Philippines
Politics of Zambales
Regionalist parties
Regionalist parties in the Philippines